American rapper Kurupt has released six studio albums, three compilation albums, one EP and seven singles. Since his debut in 1998 he has released through a number of labels, Including Antra, Death Row and Universal. He is a close associate of Daz Dillinger (as one half of Tha Dogg Pound), Snoop Dogg and Dr. Dre.

Born Ricardo Brown in Philadelphia, he moved to Los Angeles to join Death Row Records. As a recording artist he made his debut on Dr. Dre's The Chronic in 1992. He continued to make a number other guest appearances, including Snoop Dogg's Doggystyle the year after. The collaborative record Dogg Food brought further into the limelight and Brown made his solo debut on the double-album Kuruption! on A&M Records. Released in October 1998, one disc of the album was dedicated to the West Coast and the other to the East Coast. It reached No. 8 in the Billboard 200, the highest position he would attain in his career.

His subsequent albums had moderate success, with Space Boogie: Smoke Oddessey reaching No. 10 in the Billboard 200. In 2004 he returned to Death Row for Against tha Grain and has since released records through different outlets. Throughout his career he has continued to make guest appearances for Snoop Dogg and affiliated acts.

Albums

Studio albums

Collaborative albums

Compilation albums

Instrumental albums

Mixtapes
Tha 420 Mixtape (2010)
Money, Bitches, Power (2013)

Extended plays

Singles

As lead artist

As featured artist

Collaborative singles

Guest appearances

References 

Hip hop discographies